Sour Patch Kids (known as Very Bad Kids in France, and known as Maynards Sour Patch Kids in Canada and previously in the UK) are a brand of soft candy with a coating of invert sugar and sour sugar (a combination of citric acid, tartaric acid, and sugar). The slogans "Sour Then Sweet" and "Sour. Sweet. Gone." refer to the candy's sour-to-sweet taste.

History
Sour Patch Kids were originally created by Frank Galatolie of Jaret International, under the name of Mars Men in the early 1970s. In the late 1970s, Cadbury and the Smeera Blyton Licorice Company of Sweden formed the Allen Candy Company in Hamilton, Ontario, to produce them. In 1985 they re-branded to Sour Patch Kids, but it is now owned by Santi. The name was likely changed to capitalize on the popularity of Cabbage Patch Kids.

Current flavors
Berry, Grape, Lime, Lemon, Orange, Peach, Blue 
Raspberry, Strawberry, Watermelon, Apple, Pineapple.

Brands

Current Brands 
Original, Berries, and Tropical.

Discontinued Brands 
Chillers.

Video game

World Gone Sour is a 2011 video game based on Sour Patch Kids. It was developed by Playbrains and published by Capcom. It was released on December 20, 2011, for PC, April 10, 2012, for PlayStation Network, and April 11, 2012, for Xbox Live Arcade (XBLA).

References

External links
 Official website

Brand name confectionery
Cadbury Adams brands
Products introduced in 1985
Mondelez International brands
Candy
Canadian confectionery
American confectionery